Prosena is a genus of flies in the family Tachinidae.

Species

Prosena arcuata Malloch, 1932
Prosena argentata Curran, 1927
Prosena bella Curran, 1927
Prosena bisetosa Malloch, 1932
Prosena conica Guerin, 1831
Prosena dimidiata Curran, 1938
Prosena dispar Macquart, 1851
Prosena doddi Curran, 1927
Prosena dorsalis Macquart, 1847
Prosena facialis Curran, 1929
Prosena fulvipes (Townsend, 1927)
Prosena jactans (Walker, 1858)
Prosena lurida Walker, 1861
Prosena macropus Thomson, 1869
Prosena marginalis Curran, 1938
Prosena nigripes Curran, 1927
Prosena pectoralis (Walker, 1858)
Prosena rufiventris Macquart, 1847
Prosena scutellaris Curran, 1929
Prosena secedens Walker, 1864
Prosena siberita (Fabricius, 1775)
Prosena surda Curran, 1938
Prosena tenuipes (Walker, 1853)
Prosena tenuis Malloch, 1930
Prosena varia Curran, 1929
Prosena variegata Curran, 1929
Prosena vittata Guerin-Meneville, 1838
Prosena zonalis Curran, 1929

References

Diptera of Europe
Dexiinae
Tachinidae genera
Taxa named by Amédée Louis Michel le Peletier
Taxa named by Jean Guillaume Audinet-Serville